Bill T. James (born 23 March 1937) is a former Australian rules footballer who played with Geelong in the Victorian Football League (VFL).

James came over from Geelong West to play three senior games for Geelong in the 1957 VFL season. The following year he was back at Geelong West and won the Ballarat Football League's best and fairest award.

References

1937 births
Australian rules footballers from Victoria (Australia)
Geelong Football Club players
Geelong West Football Club players
Living people